The Massachusetts Avenue Line, designated Route N2, N4, N6, is a daily bus route operated by the Washington Metropolitan Area Transit Authority between Friendship Heights station of the Red Line of the Washington Metro and Farragut Square in Downtown Washington DC. The line operates every 24–30 minutes during the weekdays and 35–45 minutes on weekends. Trips take roughly 45 minutes to complete.

Route description
The Massachusetts Avenue Line is operated by routes N2, N4, and N6. Routes N2 and N4 only operate during weekdays while route N6 operates after 7:00 PM on weekdays and all day on weekends as a combination of routes N2 and N4. 

Route N2 operates via Wisconsin Avenue, Nebraska Avenue, New Mexico Avenue, Cathedral Avenue, Idaho Avenue (to Friendship Heights), Massachusetts Avenue, Connecticut Avenue, 18th Street, and P Street which the route terminating along 17th and I Streets NW, serving the Wesley Heights neighborhood.

Route N4 operates along Western Avenue, Westmoreland Circle, and Massachusetts Avenue following the N2 routing to Dupont Circle.

Route N6 operates along the N4 routing, but operates on a clockwise loop in Wesley Heights along the N2 routing along Idaho Avenue, Cathedral Avenue, New Mexico Avenue, and Nebraska Avenue, going westbound to Friendship Heights and eastbound to Farragut Square.

Route N2, N4, and N6 currently operate out of Western division. Select route N2 and N4 rush-hour trips are operated by Montgomery division. During the afternoon peak hours, routes N2 and N4 utilize the 2016 New Flyer XE40 buses WMATA owns (1001).

History

The N2 and N4 originally began operating under streetcar lines by the Washington Railway & Electric Company in the 1900s. The route would operate between the Friendship Heights neighborhood to Downtown Washington D.C. Differences for the N2 and N4 was the N2 would operate in the Wesley Heights neighborhood along Nebraska Avenue, New Mexico Avenue, Cathedral Avenue, Idaho Avenue while the N4 remains along Massachusetts Avenue. The N2 and N4 later were formed into buses on May 13, 1925.

When the Capital Transit Company took over the Washington Railway & Electric Company, route N4 was rerouted to Glen Echo Park along the Maryland side of Massachusetts Avenue and Goldsboro Road.

The N4 routing to Glen Echo Park was later replaced by route N7 and Ride On route 29 when the N4 was shortened to terminate at Westmoreland Circle.

Route N1 and N3 were introduced to operate as the Massachusetts Avenue–Federal Triangle Line providing express service along Massachusetts Avenue going from Friendship Heights to Federal Triangle. But both routes were eliminated.

The Capital Transit Company was later acquired by DC Transit in 1956 which later formed into Metrobus on February 4, 1973.

On August 25, 1984, when Friendship Heights station opened, routes N1, N2, and N3 were rerouted to terminate at the newly opened station.

A new N6 was later introduced to operate alongside the N2 and N4 but run during the late nights and weekends as a combination to routes N2 and N4 operating in the Wesley Heights Neighborhood alongside the N2 in the clockwise direction (going westbound) but remaining along Massachusetts Avenue going eastbound.

In 1996, routes N1 and N3 were eliminated and replaced by route N4 which was extended from its terminus from Westmoreland Circle to Friendship Heights station along Western Avenue.

On December 29, 1996, route N6 was eliminated and replaced by routes N2 and N4 which added late night and weekend service at frequencies of every 24–32 minutes during weekday peak periods in the counterclockwise direction, every 36 minutes weekdays between approximately 9:30 AM and 3:30 PM, every 40 minutes weekday evenings after 7:30 PM, and every 50 minutes on Saturdays and Sundays.

In 1999, route N6 was reincarnated on its previous routing to replace the N2 and N4 during the late nights and weekends as both routes had low ridership during the post PM Peak hours and weekends. Route N6 would operate for the N2 and N4 as one route to fill the low demand the N2 and N4 had during the times the N6 will operate.

On June 25, 2000, route N2 was rerouted to operate along Wisconsin Avenue, Tenley Circle, and Nebraska Avenue instead of operating along Western Avenue as the route overlapped the N4. The reroute N2 would serve the Tenleytown neighborhood and Tenleytown–AU station plus give additional service for routes 30, 32, 34, 35, and 36 along Wisconsin Avenue and route M4 along portions of Nebraska Avenue. Service between Ward Circle and Cathedral and Massachusetts Avenues (to Farragut Square) plus Massachusetts and Idaho Avenues (to Friendship Heights) were unaffected.

A new route N3 was also introduced to operate during the weekday peak hours in the peak direction between Friendship Heights station and Federal Triangle via the N4 routing along Western Avenue and Massachusetts Avenue, but turn onto 20th Place and operate along 23rd Street, Virginia Avenue, Constitution Avenue, and 12th Street terminating along Pennsylvania Avenue and 10th Street during the AM Peak Hours and beginning on 12th Street and Constitution Avenue during the PM Peak Hours.

In 2010 during WMATA's FY2011 budget, WMATA proposed to eliminate the N3 as it overlaps other services and to only operate the N2 and N4 during the weekday peak hours. Route N6 would operate during the weekday midday hours with post PM peak hours and weekend service remaining unchanged. WMATA also proposed to reroute the N2 along Massachusetts Avenue, Westmoreland Circle, and Western Avenue from Ward Circle. Alternative service is provided by route M4 along Nebraska Avenue and Tenleytown station and routes 32 and 36 along Wisconsin Avenue.

On September 25, 2011, route N2 was rerouted along Massachusetts Avenue, Westmoreland Circle, and Western Avenue via the N3, N4, and N6 routing in order to replace portions of route N8 which was eliminated. Service to Tenleytown–AU station and the N2 portion along Nebraska Avenue was discontinued.

Route N3 was also rerouted from the Friendship Heights bus bays to begin/end at Western Avenue and Jenifer Street due to Friendship Heights reaching its bus capacity. Passengers would have to walk a short distance to the Mazza Gallerie Metro station entrance as a result.

Many residents from Glover Park and Wesley Heights voiced frustration over the N2 reroute with residents losing direct access to Tenleytown–AU station. Brian Cohen, the chair of Advisory Neighborhood Commission 3B, told WMATA and DDOT representatives who attended a December 2011 meeting that as a public entity, metro's first obligation is to serve the public stated:

WMATA Bus planner David Erion told residents that the change to the N2 line was not "significant enough" to meet the legal threshold requiring public input. But many residents called Erion's statement pathetic and that both WMATA and DDOT have total disdain for both Glover Park and Wesley Heights. DDOT's Steve Strauss told neighbors that in making the changes, both his agency and WMATA assumed the community "wanted to maintain the Spring Valley connection."

Other Glover Park residents argued that the impacts of inclement weather and insufficient lighting make some of the streets no longer served by the N2 difficult and potentially dangerous. Other common complaints were that the buses will switch suddenly from the N2 to the N4 without any notice, suddenly instead of going to Cathedral Avenue, they are driven farther down Massachusetts Avenue.

The Advisory Neighborhood Commission passed a resolution asking DDOT and WMATA to restore the N2 route prior to the September 2011 changes Commissioners reasoned that the change was made so quickly in the first place that the agencies should be able to just switch them back. DDOT and WMATA said it would not be so easy. Julie Hershorn, a manager from WMATA's Office of Bus Planning, said one issue is that a change in the bus system can have a domino effect. If the buses are "inter-lining," it is possible that, for instance, when N2 bus reaches the end of its route, it could become another line entirely.

Due to the N2 reroute, Wesley Heights and Glover Park passengers wanting to go to Tenleytown would have to ride the N2 up to Ward Circle, then transfer to the infrequent M4 in order to reach Tenleytown. Passengers would then have to walk from the bus bays along Fort Drive and 40th Street to Wisconsin Avenue and catch the 32 or 36 to Friendship Heights to get off stops along Wisconsin Avenue. Or passengers were forced to ride the N2 all the way further to Friendship Heights station, then catch the 32, 36, or 37 buses for stops along Wisconsin Avenue and Tenleytown station. In all, passengers would need to transfer once or twice to reach their destinations. In response to the changes, WMATA announced on December 9, 2011, that route N2 would be rerouted back along the former routing along Wisconsin Avenue, Tenley Circle, and Nebraska Avenue beginning on January 22, 2012. This gave Wesley Heights and Glover Park residents access to Tenleytown–AU station as the September 2011 reroute abruptly taken away service to Tenleytown.

In September 2015, WMATA proposed to eliminate all N3 service and replace it with the N4 due to low ridership and other services covering the route. Riders can ride the N4 up to 20th Street and transfer to the H1, L1 or S1 to Potomac Park/Foggy Bottom–GWU station and routes 30N, 30S, 32, 33, and 36 to Federal Triangle.

On June 26, 2016, route N3 was eliminated and replaced by route N4. Select weekday peak hour N4 trips in the weekday peak hour direction were extended to Potomac Park along H Street and 18th Street (to Friendship Heights), I Street, and 19th Street (to Potomac Park), and Virginia Avenue as well. Also routes N2, N4, and N6 terminus at Farragut Square were moved from the east side to the west side.

During the COVID-19 pandemic, routes N2 and N4 were suspended beginning on March 16, 2020 and route N6 operated on its Saturday supplemental schedule. However on March 18, 2020, further changes happened with route N6 operating on its Sunday schedule and weekend service being suspended beginning on March 21, 2020. A modified schedule and all weekend service resumed on August 23, 2020 with routes N2 and N4 remaining suspended.

On September 10, 2020, as part of WMATA's FY2022 budget, WMATA proposed to fully eliminate routes N2 and N4 and instead operate the N6 daily in order to simplify the line and low federal funds. Routes N2 and N4 have not operated since March 13, 2020 due to Metro's response to the COVID-19 pandemic being replaced full time by route N6.

In February 2021, WMATA proposed to combine the N6 with the D2 and M4 if WMATA does not get any federal funding. The new N6 will operate along the D2 routing between Glover Park and Dupont Circle station, then operate along the N6 routing inside Cathedral Heights, then operate on the M4 routing along Nebraska Avenue to Sibley Memorial Hospital. Routes N2 and N4 would also be eliminated However on September 5, 2021, WMATA restored Routes N2 and N4 to its pre pandemic schedule and reverted Route N6 back to its weekday late night schedule. However, N4 trips to Potomac Park was eliminated.

References

Street railways in Washington, D.C.
N2
1908 establishments in Washington, D.C.